Doon Academy is a secondary school in Dalmellington that caters to the local surrounding areas Dalmellington, Patna, Rankinston and Bellsbank. The current head teacher is Kenneth Reilly who took over from John Mackenzie in 2014. 

Doon Academy’s Motto is Respectful, Resilient, Ready. 

The school has several “faculties” headed by Principal Teachers. These faculties each specialise in a different subject.

Language & Literacy - English, Scottish & French

Mathematics & Numeracy - Mathematics, Numeracy & Financial Education

Science - Biology, Physics & Chemistry 

Social Subjects - Modern Studies, History, Geography, Sociology & Psychology

Expressive Arts - Art & Design, Digital Media & Music

Technologies - Woodwork, Metalwork, Crafts & Graphic Design

Digital Literacies - Business Studies, Computing, Administration and Computer Game Design

Physical Education & Health and Well-being - Physical Education & Duke of Edinburgh award

Pupil Support - Guidance, Learning Support and Inclusion (Doon Academy has an Inclusion Hub and Supported Learning Centre which offer additional support where appropriate)

Developing Young Workforce - Barista Skills, Hair, Nail & Beauty Therapy & Gardening Skills

The school also has a fully stocked library with IT facilities which is accessible to all pupils.

Associated Primary Schools

The school services 5 local primary schools: Bellsbank Primary School, Dalmellington Primary School, Littlemill Primary School, Patna Primary School and St. Xaviers Primary School. Children from other schools may be able to attend Doon Academy on approval of a placing request. 
Schools in East Ayrshire
Dalmellington